The Havre Union transatlantic packet line was organized in the 1830s from the joining of the Havre Old Line and the Havre Whitlock Line. In the shipping industry, the term packet ship was used to describe a vessel that featured regularly scheduled service on a specific point-to-point line. Usually, the individual ship operated exclusively for the line.

The first American packet line to sail between an American and European port began operating in 1818. It employed four ships and offered a monthly service between New York and Liverpool, England. In 1822 and 1823, three packet lines were organized between New York and Le Havre, France.

Havre Old Line

The early success of the Liverpool packet lines encouraged the organization of packet service between New York and Le Havre, France. In 1822 Francis Depau established the first packet line to run between those two ports. The first ship sailed September 10, 1822 with Miles R. Burke as its captain. The line came to be known as the Havre Old Line.

Francis Depau was born in France in 1773. In 1789, when he was sixteen years old, he went to  Saint-Domingue (today's Haiti) to work at his uncle's merchant house. The slave revolt of 1791 forced Depau to relocate to Charleston, South Carolina, where he established his own merchant house. In 1798, he married Sylvie de Grasse, the youngest daughter of the Comte de Grasse. (de Grasse was the Admiral who commanded the French fleet at the Battle of the Chesapeake.) By 1812 Depau had moved his merchant house to New York City, where he was running a mercantile trading business and a shipping business.

The Havre Old Line stated with two ships, the Stephania and Montano. Francis Depau, Isaac Bell, and Capt. Miles R. Burke were the joint owners of the ships. Within a year the Havre Old Line was operating four ships, the Henry and Lewis being added alongside the first two vessels.

Francis Depau's merchant house handled the line's business. His firm owned warehouse space for the storage of goods. It shipped and received goods on its own accounts. It acted as a commission agent for importing goods from France. The firm also moved general freight (cotton, grain, naval stores) for other enterprises. Finally, the firm handled the growing passenger business.

Only four months after the Havre Old Line inaugurated service to Le Havre, the Havre Second Line was organized (January 1823), and shortly after that, William Whitlock, Jr. began a third line.

Havre Old Line ships
Ships in Service for the Havre Old Line

Havre Whitlock Line
In 1823 William Whitlock, Jr. established the third packet line between New York and Le Havre, France. Whitlock was the son of a sea captain and ship owner and would become an extensive exporter of raw cotton. In the early 1820s, Whitlock was responsible for establishing coastal packet service between Savannah, Georgia and New York City. These ships delivered southern cotton to New York, which was then transshipped to Europe on Atlantic packet ships. Whitlock's business flourished until the beginning of the American Civil War.

Whitlock began his line with one ship, the 306-ton Cadmus. This vessel sailed in a one-ship line for five years. The Cadmus was replaced in 1829 by the Formosa, a new, 450-ton ship which ran alone until 1831. In that year a second ship, the Albany, was added to make a two-ship line. Then a third ship was added in 1833. By the end of 1838 the Whitlock line was operating four ships, the Albany, Poland, Emerald, and Duchesse d'Orleans.

Unlike other American packet lines, Whitlock was the sole owner and operator of his ships. Usually the agents, builders, and captains of the individual ships were part owners of the vessels. Ships, each with a variety of owners, were then controlled and managed by the line in strict conformity with a general plan. William Whitlock, Jr. was unique in that he owned his ships outright and operated them in his own name.

Havre Whitlock Line ships

Ships in Service for the Havre Whitlock Line

Havre Union Line

In the 1830s, Whitlock owned three Havre packets outright, operated them in his own name, but ran them in conjunction with the Havre Old Line. Francis Depau had retired in 1830, and his sons-in-law, Samuel M. Fox and Mortimer Livingston, took over the Havre Old Line. After Depau died in 1836, the mercantile business became "Fox & Livingston."

By 1833, the Havre Whitlock Line and the Havre Old Line had joined and were operating under the name Havre Union Line. Whitlock continued to own his own vessels and to act as an agent for his ships while the Havre Old Line ships continued to be owned by various individuals and the firm Fox & Livingston acted as the agent for those vessels.

In 1835, for example, the New York Evening Post contained an announcement that "Havre Packets" on the "Union Line" departed "from New York on the 8th, 16th, and 24th of every month," while returning ships departed "from Havre on the 1st, 8th, and 16th of every month." Departure dates and captains were given for each of eleven ships. The list included eight vessels from the Havre Old Line and three vessels from the Havre Whitlock Line. Today we might describe this arrangement as a "joint venture," although it lasted for quite some time.

The same arrangements existed ten years later. In 1845,  The New York State Register identified the agents and ships that operated as the Havre Union Line. It announced that a Havre Union Line ship sailed from New York to Le Havre every month on the 8th, 16th, and 24th, and that a ship sailed from Le Havre every month on the 1st, 8th, and 24th. The sailing scheduled had not change over these ten years. Twelve ships were identified and the agents for the vessels were the firm of William Whitlock, Jr. and the firm of Fox & Livingston. This arrangement, too, had not changed.

Packet Ships of the Havre Union Line, 1845

The Havre Union Line never became twelve ships controlled by a single merchant house. In April 1845, the New York Evening Mirror contained an advertisement announcing that the "packet ship Argo" would sail on April 8th. William Whitlock, Jr. was identified as the agent. The same newspaper contained announcements that the Sully would sail for Le Havre on April 16th and the Silvie de Grasse on April 24th. The agent for the latter two ships was the firm of Fox & Livingston, the operators of the Havre Old Line. 
 "Packet of the 8th of April—The packet ship Argo, C. Anthony, master, will sail [for Havre] on her regular day. For freight or passage, apply on board, at pier No. 13 East River, or to Wm. Whitlock, Jr., 46 South st."
 "Packet of the 16th of April—The packet ship Sully, Captain Wm. C. Edgar, will sail on her regular day [for Havre]. For freight or passage, apply on board, or to Fox & Livingston, 22 Broad st."
 "Packet of the 24th of April—The packet ship Silvie de Grasse, Capt. Wm. C. Thompson, will sail on her regular day [for Havre]. For freight or passage, apply on board, or to Fox & Livingston, 22 Broad st."

Cooperative control of the Havre Union Line continued until the service was discontinued during the Civil War.

Lost ships
The Havre Old Line had used 25 ships to provide packet service between the years 1822 and 1863. In this forty-year period, three ships were wrecked and two experienced accidents that withdrew them from service. Although the Francois I was repaired and reentered service, the Francis Depau had to be condemned and was sold. The three wrecked ships were lost.

The Havre Whitlock Line had used 14 ships between 1823 and 1864. Only one ship, Poland, was lost while functioning as a packet ship. The Poland entered service in 1833 and burned at sea in 1840. William A. Fairburn told the story of the disaster. The ship sailed from New York for Le Havre on May 11, 1840. Onboard the ship was a crew of thirty-four officers and men, twenty-four cabin passengers, and eleven steerage passengers—a total of sixty-nine people. The ship carried $108,000 in specie, and a cargo consisting of 270 bales of cotton, 2,700 barrels of flour, 22 barrels of potash, and 80 casks of tree bark. The cotton was stowed in the lower forward hold. Although cotton was known to be flammable, the Poland was carrying much less than was typically carried on an eastbound passage. 

On May 16, only five days after the departure, a rainstorm occurred. A flash of lightning struck the foremast, ran into the fore hold, and set the cotton on fire. Because the cotton was stowed low, the crew could not get to it, so the men battened down the hatches hoping to smother it. The Poland did not have sufficient small boats to carry all sixty-nine people on the ship. Thus, the passengers filled the boats and were towed astern while the crew remained on the ship. This situation continued for two days, with smoke pouring from the packet and the deck too hot to walk on.

On May 18, a triangular cotton trader named Clifton "fortuitously put in an appearance in the nick of time to rescue the passengers and crew. All on board were saved, but the Poland was totally destroyed by fire."

End of the line
The Havre Union Line operated until 1863-1864 when service was discontinued because of the American Civil War. All the packet lines had carried large amounts of raw cotton from New York to both Liverpool and Le Havre. Compared to the Liverpool lines, however, "the French lines had been virtually sustained … by shipments of southern cotton." Because the War cut New York's supply of cotton, by 1863 the New York to Le Havre packet service had "degenerated into an occasional, desultory sailing."

In the early years of the War, the Havre Old Line reduced its service from eight to three ships a year. In 1863 the Havre Old Line withdrew its remaining vessels and discontinued sailing for Le Havre. In the same year, the Havre Whitlock Line withdrew three of its four vessels, and, thus, in 1864 the Havre Union Line was running only a single ship, the Helvetica, across the ocean. At the end of 1864 Whitlock withdrew that ship as well, ending the Havre Union transatlantic packet service.

References

Bibliography

 
 

Packet (sea transport)
American companies established in 1823
Transport companies established in 1823
Defunct shipping companies of the United States